Martin Grove Brumbaugh (April 14, 1862March 14, 1930) was an American Republican politician who served as the 26th governor of Pennsylvania from 1915 until 1919. He is frequently referred to as M.G. Brumbaugh, as is common in the Brumbaugh family. He was president of Juniata College and the first education commissioner for Puerto Rico.

Life and career
Brumbaugh was born in Huntingdon County, Pennsylvania. He grew up in rural Huntingdon County and worked in the combination country store-post office that was operated by his father. He was raised in a small pacifist faith with German roots, the German Baptist Brethren, popularly called Dunkers. Brumbaugh attended Huntingdon Normal School, graduating in 1881. A voracious reader and researcher, he later earned degrees in mechanical engineering, philosophy, and the general sciences before earning a Ph.D. from the University of Pennsylvania in 1894. He returned to Huntingdon Normal School, now renamed Juniata College, in 1895, and continued at the post until 1910. He remained closely connected to the college, returning to the position of the president in 1924.

A leading proponent of educational modernization, Brumbaugh oversaw reform of the teacher training curriculum for the state of Louisiana. After the American Invasion of Puerto Rico, then a  wealthy overseas province of Spain, and the Treaty of Paris of 1899, Brumbaugh was charged with implementation of an American-style educational system in Puerto Rico. Brumbaugh dissolved the entire Education Ministry that had been in place for centuries. Then Brumbaugh had the entire public school faculty, most of whom were trained professors of either Antillean or Peninsular Spanish origins, fired and deported. He then brought from the US a great number of Anglophone school teachers, including his cousin Dr. D. Brumbaugh, considered more "friendly to the American cause". The problem was that the American school teachers spoke only English, and the island's primary language was Spanish, with great numbers of French and Italian speakers. In less than 18 months, after Brumbaugh took over, school absenteeism shot up to 98% with the ensuing performance collapse of a population that spoke one language and the teachers another. Those children who did go to school were punished for speaking Spanish, and put down for their culture. The next thing Brumbaugh did, with the backing of the US Military Government, was to change the entire curriculum, to "Americanize it". He re-wrote the entire Puerto Rican history curriculum, sanitized it and purged from it any data threatening to the "American cause". In addition, he began to edit and doctor data so as to exacerbate anything political or social by the former Spanish Authorities, making it negative, out of context and proportion, in a national humiliation process that caused tremendous public outrage and protests. To this day, the island's educational system is still suffering from Brumbaugh's "reforms". After he left Puerto Rico he held lecturer positions at the University of Pennsylvania and Harvard University. In 1906, he became superintendent of the Philadelphia Public Schools and gained statewide recognition for his performance in this role.

A conservative and religious but usually apolitical man, Brumbaugh was nevertheless courted by the Republican Party to run for governor in 1914, after corruption and infighting marred the 1910 campaign. While in office, Brumbaugh fought to expand educational funding, spur highway construction, and support  farmers but also blocked labor reform and supported alcohol prohibition. During his term in office he chided the state legislature for spending beyond its means and emphasized this point by vetoing 409 pieces of legislation. He received the largest share of the popular vote in the 1916 Republican Party presidential primaries.

Brumbaugh died of a heart attack on March 14, 1930, while playing golf on vacation in Pinehurst, North Carolina.

Legacy

Brumbaugh Hall is one of the 14 residence halls in the East Halls area of the Pennsylvania State University University Park campus, all named after Pennsylvania Governors. In the college town of Río Piedras, Puerto Rico, Calle Brumbaugh is a street named after Brumbaugh. He was president of the Pennsylvania German Society in 1927.

The Dr. Martin G. Brumbaugh Graded School, in Santa Isabel, Puerto Rico, named for him, is listed on the National Register of Historic Places.

Selected works 

 
 
 
 
 
  (incomplete version on Wikisource)

References

External links

 
 

1862 births
1930 deaths
Republican Party governors of Pennsylvania
Christian writers
American members of the Church of the Brethren
Church of the Brethren clergy
Juniata College alumni
Candidates in the 1916 United States presidential election
20th-century American politicians
University of Pennsylvania faculty
Harvard University faculty
Juniata College
University of Pennsylvania alumni